The Nokia 6555 is a brand of mobile phone launched in the third quarter of 2007. It came in 4 colors: red, gold, silver and black.

Features 
 Active-matrix 240 x 320 pixel (QVGA) 2,0” main display with 16M Colors
 Secondary display in 128 x 160 pixel with 262k colors
 Video recorder with audio support (records up to 60 seconds in 176 x 144 resolution)
 Streaming video and audio
 Wireless connectivity with Bluetooth
 30 MB internal memory
 Java MIDP 2.0 applications
 Data synchronization with PC via PC Suite
 Quad-band operation in GSM 850/900/1800/1900 networks

Additional features:
 Nokia Operating System 40 5th edition
 Micro SD card slot
 Micro-USB 2.0
 HSCSD data transfer up to 43.2 kbit/s

References 

6555
Mobile phones introduced in 2007